Cédric Marie Carlos Thérèse Van Branteghem (born 13 March 1979 in Ghent) is a Belgian sprinter, who specializes in the 400 metres.

Achievements

Personal bests
100 metres - 10.54 s (2003)
200 metres - 20.60 s (2003)
400 metres - 45.02 s (2003)

References

External links
 

1979 births
Living people
Belgian male sprinters
Olympic athletes of Belgium
Athletes (track and field) at the 2004 Summer Olympics
Athletes (track and field) at the 2008 Summer Olympics
Sportspeople from Ghent
European Athletics Championships medalists
World Athletics Indoor Championships medalists